The Athletics Bridge is an annual track and field meeting which takes place at the Mestský štadión in Dubnica nad Váhom, Slovakia. As one of the European Athletics Outdoor Classic Meetings, it is typically among of the last competitions held in the European summer track and field circuit.

The meeting was first held in 2003 and started life in Banská Bystrica, another Slovak city. Taking inspiration from the IAAF Golden League, the organising committee (headed by Milan Hort) set about creating their own national version. Consisting of a two-day "double meet", it mirrored the jackpot format with 250,000 Slovak Crowns being divided up between athletes who won an event on both days. The first edition mainly attracted Slovak, Hungarian and Ukrainian athletes, but the second gained European Athletics status and expanded to include other Europeans and African athletes. The following two years saw top level athletes compete, with eight World Championships medallists taking part in 2005, and ten medallists from the 2006 European Athletics Championships being in attendance the next year.

The Athletics Bridge meet was beset with financial difficulties in 2007 and as a result the Dubnica nad Váhom-based Atletický Klub Spartak Dubnica decided to take on the organisation of the meeting from then onwards. Changing to the more traditional one-day meeting format, it became allied with the Euro Meetings group and Hort remained as the meet director, with Alfons Juck serving as the competition manager. A wide variety of top-level athletes were present that year (including Roman Sebrle, Dayron Robles, Yargelis Savigne, Koji Murofushi and Ezekiel Kemboi) and the event attracted around 3700 people (the highest ever for an athletics event in Dubnica). In 2008, fourteen medalists from the 2008 Beijing Olympics entered the competition. Olympic gold medallist in the 110 metres hurdles, Dayron Robles, provided the meet highlight with a run of 12.95 seconds despite a strong headwind. Around 6000 people saw the meet in 2009 and the 2010 edition was host to a Slovak record through Lucia Klocová's run of 4:08.86 minutes in the 1500 metres. Cementing its position as Slovakia's foremost one-day athletics meet, some 17 world championship medallists were present in 2011.

Meet records
Meet records are as follows:

Men

Women

References

External links
Official website
Meeting records

Annual track and field meetings
Athletics in Slovakia
Recurring sporting events established in 2003
2003 establishments in Slovakia